Ben 10 is an American reboot animated television series created by Man of Action for Cartoon Network. The series is served as a parallel world. The series premiered in Australia, New Zealand and Asia-Pacific on October 1, 2016, and premiered in the United States on April 10, 2017, before concluding on April 11, 2021, after four seasons, a film, and three specials, the latter featuring a crossover with Generator Rex and previous Ben 10 television series continuity, via the concept of the multiverse.

A film based on the series, Ben 10 Versus the Universe: The Movie, was announced on February 19, 2020, and was aired on October 10, 2020.

Plot
Building on the highly successful franchise about kid hero Ben Tennyson, Ben 10 introduces a re-imagined Ben, his cousin Gwen, and Grandpa Max, as they travel the country during summer vacation. When Ben finds the Omnitrix, a mysterious watch that transforms him into 10 different aliens, a world of extraterrestrial superpowers opens up to him. The series is produced by Cartoon Network Studios and created and executive produced by Man of Action Entertainment (Big Hero 6, Generator Rex and the original four Ben 10 shows in their shared continuity), with John Fang (Mixels, Generator Rex) on board as supervising producer.

Season 1 (2017)
Ten-year-old Ben Tennyson has spent his summer vacation traveling across the country with his cousin Gwen and Grandpa Max, in an RV nicknamed the Rustbucket. However, after coming across a strange high-tech watch known as the Omnitrix, which enables him to transform into 10 alien heroes, he finds himself in the position of a superhero. At each place his family stops, Ben goes from trying to find a source of entertainment to doing battle against supervillains such as the mad scientist Dr. Animo, the dark sorcerer Hex, the psychotic clown Zombozo, the technology-loathing Steam Smythe, the emotionless Weatherheads, amongst other threats both big and small. Despite having lots to learn, he hones his hero skills with Gwen and Max's help.

While battling one of Animo's mutant creations during a trip to Portland, Ben unlocks an 11th alien he names Gax, a Chimera Sui Generis with laser vision and great strength. However, unlocking this form seems to have an odd effect on the Omnitrix, leaving him unable to control his transformations. To determine the source of this issue, Max calls in his old friend Phil. Ben finds himself under attack from three alien bounty hunters: Tetrax, Kraab, and Sixsix. While he's able to fend them off, he meets a mysterious aged Chimera Sui Generis calling himself "Vil", who trains Ben to use Gax's powers. However, it turns out "Vil" and Gax are the two halves of the alien conqueror Vilgax, who absorbs Gax's power to restore himself to full strength. The bounty hunter trio were hired to prevent Vilgax from reforming and thus team up with Ben to prevent Vilgax from destroying the Omnitrix. However, Vilgax wins this battle, dispatching the hunters and leaving Ben rapidly changing between his alien forms and unable to return to human form.

Vilgax intends to use lava from Mount Megalodon to recharge his ship and restart his conquering spree. Ben, regardless of his current state, engages Vilgax in battle; while initially hampered by his inability to predict which form he'll become next, Ben is able to turn the tides and defeat Vilgax by using Upgrade to upgrade the Omnitrix, supposedly sacrificing the Galvanic Mechamorph.

Season 2 (2018)
The Tennysons continue to visit some of America's greatest tourist spots, as Ben continues to take his hero career to new heights. As his enemies grow stronger, Ben is aided by the appearance of new "Omni-Enhanced" versions of his alien forms, who possess a strange blue energy that packs a major punch in battle. He also has unlocked a new alien hero whom he dubs "Shock Rock", who is composed of the same blue energy.

Meanwhile, Vilgax, still seeking a method to escape Earth, forms alliances with some of Ben's enemies to harness the Omnitrix's power. Team Tennyson make it their mission to defeat Vilgax and stop his devious machinations from seeing light.

However, following a battle with Vilgax's war-bot, Ben learns that his new forms are a sign of a bigger threat. Shock Rock is a Fulmini, whose DNA pod replaced Upgrade following his sacrifice. The Fulmini Empire and their leader, the High Override, have been manipulating Ben to invade Earth and use the Omnitrix as a gateway. Ben and Vilgax team up, entering the Omnitrix and allying with Glitch, a fusion between Ben and Upgrade's DNA. Though the High Override banishes Vilgax to the Null Void and turns Ben into his mind controlled warrior, Team Tennyson are able to free Ben from his control and purge the Fulmini from the Omnitrix, causing it to reboot. Glitch survives the reboot by escaping the Omnitrix, joining the family.

Season 3 (2019)
After a serious battle with the High Override, Glitch merges with the Rustbuggy and becomes part of the Tennyson family. Ben gets frustrated when the Omnitrix reboots for a week, but it activates just as the Tennyson family is about to do some world traveling. Phil has created a helicopter called the "Omni-Copter" for the Tennyson Trio so they can travel around the world. Ben also gains access to three new aliens: Rath, Slapback, and Humungosaur, who replace Grey Matter, Overflow, and Wildvine. With Vilgax in the Null Void, Ben has a new enemy to fight: Kevin Levin, who has a variant of the Omnitrix called the Antitrix that gives him access to altered versions of Ben's aliens. Meanwhile, a mysterious villain called the Forever Knight gathers several of Ben's villains to help him go back in time and prevent aliens from making contact Earth.

Throughout the season, the Forever Knight tests Team Tennyson's enemies to determine those he needs for this goal: the final roster consists of Kevin, Charmcaster, Vin Ethanol, Billy Billions, Simon Sez, and a disillusioned Ben. Kevin, angry at the Forever Knight for discarding him during their plan's final stage, teams up with Gwen to help Ben prevent the Forever Knight from altering history. In the end, both Kevin and the Knight end up trapped in the void within time and space.

Ben and Gwen make it back to the present and head back to America aboard the Omni-Copter alongside Grandpa Max, Phil, Vin, and Simon, the latter two being convinced to join Team Tennyson. Also, Billy and Charmcaster get taken into custody, and the Forever Knight's helmet emerges from the portal on its own.

Season 4 (2020) 

In the start of Season 4, Ben unlocks the "Omni-Kix" feature on the Omnitrix, thus giving his aliens robotic armor; and later unlocks the alien Jetray, who replaces Stinkfly. He also reunites and occasionally teams up with a reluctant Kevin 11, following his surprising return from the time tunnel Forever Knight was trapped in. Ben also unlocks news aliens such as Way Big and Goop with the help of a Galvan named Azmuth.

Specials (2021) 
Ben 10,000

In an Alternate Future, an alien horde known as the Xerge attacks the Earth, forcing President Gwen to bring her retired cousin, Ben 10,000 out of retirement to fight this invasion. In response, Ben 10,000 travels back in time to recruit his younger self to fight alongside them.

Ben Gen 10

As Ben finds out his summer vacation is beginning to end, he meets Generator Rex, a E.V.O (Exponentially Variegated Organism) with the power to create machines from his body and control technology, and his friend Bobo Haha, an E.V.O. monkey. When a fight breaks out between them, Rex accidentally damages the Omnitrix, which begins leaking out all of its DNA storages, turning humans into aliens. Hex begins to control them with his powers, while the agency Providence plans to eliminate them all, so Ben and Rex must work together to repair the Omnitrix and restore everyone back to normal.

Alien X-Tinction

The Tennyson family is attacked by a dimensional-hopping alien named Alien X, who has been going around other worlds and stealing the Omnitrices of their respective Bens. An alternate version of Max shows up to help them, along with alternate universe counterparts of Ben and Gwen, who team up to stop Alien X from taking over the Multiverse.

Episodes

Characters

Main
 Ben Tennyson (voiced by Tara Strong) – The ten-year-old cousin of Gwen and grandson of Max Tennyson. He wields the Omnitrix, a watch-like device which can turn him into various extraterrestrial creatures. Strong reprises her role from the original series. 
 Gwen Tennyson (voiced by Montserrat Hernandez) – Ben's cousin, who uses her resourcefulness, keen intellect, and cunning to help in stopping villains. She has yet to develop and utilize her strong innate magical/mystical abilities.
 Max Tennyson (voiced by David Kaye) – Ben and Gwen's paternal grandfather.

Supporting
 Kevin Levin (voiced by Greg Cipes) - Ben's former school bully and the wielder of an Omnitrix derivative called the Antitrix, which allows him to turn into genetically altered versions of Ben's aliens, plus a new eleventh alien named Bashmouth. He becomes a reluctant ally on occasion following the last episodes of Season 3. As noted by Forever Knight and Charmcaster, he secretly harbors a crush on Gwen and has concerns for her safety.
 Phil Billings (voiced by John DiMaggio) - An old friend of Max and the inventor of the Omni-Copter who first appears in "Omni-Tricked".
 Glitch (voiced by Tara Strong) - A fusion of Ben and Upgrade's DNA accidentally created when Ben upgraded the Omnitrix using Upgrade in "Omni-Tricked". He originally maintained the Omnitrix from within before being freed in "Innervasion". In seasons 3 and 4, Glitch exclusively appears the form of an enhanced Rustbuggy. In Ben 10 Versus the Universe: The Movie, Glitch's Rustbuggy form is destroyed by Vilgax though he survives by reformatting himself into experimental battle armor used by Kevin. Despite the armor being damaged, Phil believes he can salvage Glitch.
 Azmuth (voiced by David Kaye) - An elderly Galvan and the creator of the Omnitrix who was imprisoned in a parallel dimension known as the Null Void until the events of Ben 10 Versus the Universe.
 Milleous (voiced by Roger Craig Smith) - The leader of a race of frog-like aliens known as the Incurseans and a court judge who appears in Ben 10 Versus the Universe.
 Major Glorff (voiced by Dee Bradley Baker) - An Incursean official under Milleous' command who appears in Ben 10 Versus the Universe.
 Ben 10,000 (voiced by Fred Tatasciore) - An adult version of Ben from a parallel future who recruits Ben to save the world from the Xerge in Ben 10,010.
 President Gwen (voiced by Montserrat Hernandez) - An adult version of Gwen from Ben 10,000's timeline and the president of the US who appears in Ben 10,010. Her inner circle consists of A.I. Max and older, reformed versions of Hex, Zombozo, Steam Smythe, Dr. Animo, Maurice, Sydney, Polar, Solar, and Kevin.
 A.I. Max (voiced by David Kaye) - A hologram version of Max from Ben 10,000's timeline and President Gwen's second-in-command who appears in Ben 10,010.
 Hitch (voiced by Tara Strong) - An android version of Glitch from Ben 10,000's timeline who appears in Ben 10,010.
 Ben Prime (voiced by Yuri Lowenthal) - An alternate version of Ben from the original continuity who visits Ben's dimension to help fight off Alien X in Alien X-Tinction.
 Alternate Max - An alternate version of Max who visits Ben's dimension to help fight off Alien X in Alien X-Tinction.
 Alternate Bens (10-year-old versions voiced by Tara Strong, teenage versions voiced by Yuri Lowenthal) - Alternate versions of Ben from various other timelines who appear in Alien X-Tinction. Three notable versions come from timelines based on past series in the franchise.
 Gwen 10 - An alternate version of Gwen from a timeline where she obtains the Omnitrix rather than Ben who visits Ben's dimension to help fight off Alien X in Alien X-Tinction.

Omnitrix Aliens
 Four Arms (voiced by John DiMaggio) - A Tetramand, a red four-armed humanoid from the desert planet Khoros whose main ability is superhuman strength.
 Future Four Arms (voiced by Fred Tatasciore) - An alternate version of Four Arms with darker red skin and a mustache used by Ben 10,000.
 Heatblast (voiced by Daryl Sabara) - A Pyronite, a magma-based humanoid from the star Pyros whose main ability is pyrokinesis.
 Future Heatblast (voiced by Fred Tatasciore) - An alternate version of Heatblast with miniature volcanoes on his shoulders used by Ben 10,000.
 XLR8 (voiced by Josh Keaton) - A Kineceleran, a blue-and-black humanoid velociraptor-like humanoid from the stormy planet Kinet whose main ability is superhuman speed.
 Diamondhead (voiced by Roger Craig Smith) - A Petrosapien, a humanoid made of teal crystal from the crystal planet Petropia whose main ability is generating crystal projectiles and structures.
 Cannonbolt (voiced by Travis Willingham) - An Arburian Pelarota, an armored pillbug-like humanoid from the beachy planet Arburia whose main ability is superhuman strength and rolling into a sphere.
 Upgrade (voiced by David Sobolov) - A Galvanic Mechamorph, a purple techno-organic blob-like humanoid from the moon Galvan B whose main ability is technological possession.
 Grey Matter (voiced by Todd Haberkorn) - A Galvan, a small grey frog-like humanoid from the planet Galvan Prime whose main ability is his high intelligence.
 Overflow (voiced by Max Mittelman) - A Cascan, an armored water-based humanoid from the ocean planet Cascareau whose main ability is hydrokinesis.
 Wildvine (voiced by David Hornsby) - A Florauna, a plant-based humanoid from the planet Flors Verdance whose main ability is chlorokinesis.
 Stinkfly (voiced by Greg Cipes) - A Lepidopterran, a humanoid blue dragonfly-like humanoid from the swamp planet Lepidopterra whose main abilities are flight and shooting goo from his shoulders.
 Gax (voiced by Yuri Lowenthal) - A Chimera Sui Generis, a green squid-like humanoid from the planet Vilgaxia whose main abilities are laser vision, superhuman strength and prehensile tentacle-like arms.
 Shock Rock (voiced by David Kaye) - A Fulmini, a stone-armored energy being from the magnetic rock-like planet Fulmas whose main ability is manipulating blue electrical energy called Omni-Enhanced energy. He first appears in season 2, replacing Upgrade.
 Slapback (voiced by Todd Haberkorn) - An Ekoleptoid, a toad-like humanoid from the city-like planet Ekoplekton whose main abilities are his self-duplication and density alteration. He first appears in season 3, replacing Grey Matter.
 Rath (voiced by Dee Bradley Baker) - An Appoplexian, a tiger-like humanoid from the jungle planet Appoplexia whose main abilities are wrist claws, superhuman strength and extreme rage. He first appears in season 2, being used by Animo, though Ben gains access to him in season 3, replacing Overflow.
 Humungousaur (voiced by David Kaye) - A Vaxasaurian, a dinosaur-like humanoid from the Earth-like jungle planet Terradino whose main abilities are massive size, superhuman strength and tail mace. He first appears in season 3, replacing Wildvine.
 Jetray (voiced by Dee Bradley Baker) - An Aerophibian, a red manta ray-like humanoid from the ocean planet Aeropela whose main abilities are flight, laser vision and tail, and adaptability to any environment. He first appears in season 4, replacing Stinkfly.
 Goop  (voiced by Dee Bradley Baker) - A Polymorph, a slime-like humanoid puppeteered by an Anti-Gravity Projector from the planet Viscosia whose main abilities are indestructibility and shapeshifting. He first appears in Ben 10 Versus the Universe: The Movie.
 Way Big (voiced by Roger Craig Smith) - A To'kustar, a massive, muscular alien born in a cosmic storm whose main abilities are superhuman strength, stamina, and the ability to fire cosmic rays by crossing his arms in an "X" shape. He first appears in Ben 10 Versus the Universe, being temporarily available to Ben so could fight Alien V. He serves as Ben's biggest and most powerful alien form.
 Spidermonkey (voiced by Dee Bradley Baker) - An Arachnichimp, a blue four-armed primate-like humanoid from the jungle planet Aranhaschimmia whose main abilities are superhuman agility and shooting webbing from his tail. He first appears in Ben 10,010 and is exclusive to Ben 10,000.
 Buzzshock (voiced by Tara Strong) - A Nosedeenian, a small black-and-white anthropomorphic battery from the Nosedeen Quasar whose main abilities are electrokinesis and possessing machinery. He first appears in Ben 10,010 and is exclusive to Ben 10,000.
 Surge (voiced by Fred Tatasciore) - A Xerge, a small purple X-shaped alien from an unknown planet whose main abilities are levitation and a connection to his races' hive mind. He first appears in Ben 10,010.
 Future Surge (voiced by Fred Tatasciore) - An alternate version of Surge with a black body used by Ben 10,000.
 Chromastone (voiced by Dee Bradley Baker) - A Crystalsapien, a humanoid alien made of purple stone and magenta crystal from the planet Petropia (Diamondhead's planet) whose main abilities are energy absorption and firing beams of a multi-colored ultraviolet energy. He first appears in Alien X-Tinction and is exclusive to Alien Force Ben.
 Big Chill (voiced by Dee Bradley Baker) - A Necrofriggian, a black and blue moth/butterfly-like humanoid from the ice planet Kylmyys whose main abilities are flight, cryokinesis, and intangibility. He first appears in Alien X-Tinction and is exclusive to Alien Force Ben.
 AmpFibian (voiced by Dee Bradley Baker) - An Amperi, a blue and white jellyfish-like humanoid from the gas planet Tesslos whose main abilities are electrokinesis, flexibility, and adaptability to any environment. He first appears in Alien X-Tinction and is exclusive to Ultimate Alien Ben.
 Ripjaws (voiced by Montserrat Hernandez) - A Piscciss Volann, a sea monster-like humanoid with the characteristics of an anglerfish, a piranha and a shark from the artificial ocean planet Piscciss whose main abilities are breathing underwater and possessing sharp teeth and claws. She first appears in Alien X-Tinction and is exclusive to Gwen 10.
 Bloxx (voiced by David Kaye) - A Segmentasapien, a gorilla-like humanoid made of red, yellow, and blue building blocks from the "ghost planet" Polyominus whose main abilities are morphing his body into various shapes using his segments and shooting pieces of himself out of guns formed from his arms dubbed Bloxx-Lobbers. He first appears in Alien X-tinction and is exclusive to Ben Prime.

Villains
 Vilgax (voiced by Yuri Lowenthal) – A Chimera Sui Generis warlord and conqueror who tries to take the Omnitrix from Ben to take over the universe, but ends up stranded on Earth after his defeat by Ben in "Omni-Tricked", and later trapped in the Null Void in "Innervasion” by the High Override. He later escapes from the Null Void and attacks the Earth In Ben 10 vs. The Universe: The Movie, which he is revealed to have helped create the Omnitrix and manipulated Kevin into creating the Antitrix. He is eventually defeated by Way Big and taken into galactic custody. Lowenthal previously voiced Ben Tennyson himself in Ben 10: Alien Force, Ben 10: Ultimate Alien and Ben 10: Omniverse.
 The High Override (voiced by Fred Tatasciore) - The villainous emperor of the Fulmini (Shock Rock's species) who first appears in the season two finale "Innervasion", before being defeated by Team Tennyson.
 The Forever Knight (voiced by Roger Craig Smith) - A mysterious armored knight who plots to alter the course of history and remove the presence of aliens from Earth. Over the course of Season 3, he recruits enemies of Team Tennyson to join his cause, including Kevin, Charmcaster, Billy Billions, Vin Ethanol, Simon Sez, and a delusional Ben. He is trapped across time by a redeemed Kevin as of "Roundabout", though his helmet escapes and gains sentience before being captured in "Cosplay Day".
 Xerge (voiced by Fred Tatasciore) - A race of small purple X-shaped aliens (Surge's race) who invade a future version of Earth before being defeated by Surge and his future self in Ben 10,010.
 Maurice (voiced by John DiMaggio) – A human-headed cockroach who loves money and filth.
 Sydney (voiced by Travis Willingham) – A cockroach-headed human who is Maurice's henchman.
 Steam Smythe (voiced by Roger Craig Smith) – A Victorian-themed man with a British accent who dislikes various elements of modern-day life, and often uses steampunk gadgets to attack.
 Hex (voiced by Robin Atkin Downes) – A powerful sorcerer who desires world domination. He wields a group of magical artifacts called the Charms of Bezel and a purple-and-gold-striped spellbook, the latter of which eventually falls into Charmcaster's possession.
 Doctor Animo (voiced by Dwight Schultz) – A mad scientist who desires to turn the world into a new age of evolution with his mind-controlled mutant animals.
 Zombozo (voiced by John DiMaggio) – An evil clown who commonly uses mind tricks and hypnotism for his schemes.
 Frightwig (voiced by Jessica DiCicco) – A 10-year-old girl and circus freak with prehensile red hair and enhanced agility.
 Acid Breath (voiced by Josh Keaton) – A circus freak who can generate acid.
 Thumbskull (voiced by John DiMaggio) – A bald-headed muscular man with super strength and a nail-like growth on his head.
 Lagrange (voiced by David Kaye) – An illegal racer with a heavy French accent who is typically seen driving a red race car. He first appears in "Drive You Crazy."
 Charmcaster (voiced by Tara Strong) - Gwen's rival and an apprentice magician who, unlike her original counterpart, is portrayed as a regular human carrying a spell book instead of a sorceress from another dimension.
 Billy Billions (voiced by Gunnar Sizemore) – A rich kid who loves to get his way. His weapons usually involve an assortment of high-tech robots.  
 Solar and Polar Twain (voiced by Todd Haberkorn and Tom Kenny) - Twin scientists who never get along with each other. Their plans for world domination usually have them plan to split it 50/50.
 Michael Morningstar (voiced by Drake Bell in "Bright Lights, Black Hearts", and Yuri Lowenthal in "The Charm Offensive") – A teen actor from Gwen's favorite TV series, the "Un-Alivers", who turns out to be a vampire that feeds on the life force of his followers. In "The Charm Offensive", Charmcaster imprisons him in her spellbook as punishment for exploiting her.
 Xingo (voiced by Tom Kenny) - An anthropomorphic purple fox who is Ben's favorite cartoon character and is not bound to normal physics.
 Lord Decibel (voiced by David Kaye) – A sadistic DJ who can control sound and music.
 The Weatherheads — A group of emotionless alien robots who can manipulate various aspects of weather. In season 4, Sunny terminates the male Weatherheads after they fail her for the last time.
 Gust-O (voiced by Eric Bauza in season 1, and Jeff Bennett in seasons 2 through 4) — The leader of the trio, who wears a light blue tie and can manipulate wind.
 Shock-O (voiced by David Kaye in Season 1, and Jeff Bennett in seasons 2 through 4) — The tallest and thinnest member of the group, who wears a yellow tie and can manipulate electricity.
 Hail-O (voiced by Jeff Bennett) — The shortest and stumpiest of the trio, who wears a blue tie and can manipulate ice.
 Sunny (voiced by Tara Strong) — The Weatherhead Trio's female superior, who can manipulate fire and seems to display more emotion than the three male Weatherheads combined.
 Null Void Inmates - Alien criminals imprisoned in the Null Void.
 Ectonurite Prisoner (voiced by Yuri Lowenthal) - An Ectonurite, a ghost-like alien from perpetually the dark planet Anur Phaetos.
 Opticoid Prisoner (voiced by Dee Bradley Baker) - An Opticoid, a bat-like humanoid with multiple eyes on his upper torso from the gelatinous planet Sightra.
 Piscciss Volann Prisoner (voiced by David Kaye) - A Null Void inmate from the same species as Ripjaws.
 Vulpimancer Prisoner (vocal effects provided by Daryl Sabara) - A Vulpimancer, an orange sightless dog-like alien from the pitch-black planet Vulpin.
 Loboan Prisoner (vocal effects provided by John DiMaggio) - A Loboan, a werewolf-like alien from the moon Luna Lobo.

Antitrix aliens
Unlike the Omnitrix aliens they are modeled after, the Antitrix aliens are all voiced by Greg Cipes and sound just like their user Kevin. Meanwhile, Alien V and Anti-Vilgax are voiced by Yuri Lowenthal and sound just like their user Vilgax.
 Quad Smack - Kevin's version of Four Arms, who is colored purple and has spiked red and black armor.
 Hot Shot - Kevin's version of Heatblast, who is significantly larger and has an olive green chest.
 Rush - Kevin's version of XLR8, who is colored green and has grayish-green armor.
 Crystalfist - Kevin's version of Diamondhead, who is made of purple crystal rather than teal.
 Wreckingbolt - Kevin's version of Cannonbolt, who has spiked armor plating.
 Bootleg - Kevin's version of Upgrade, who is colored blue and has a red eye and spiked armor.
 Dark Matter - Kevin's version of Grey Matter, who is significantly larger and can create fire with crystallizing properties.
 Undertow - Kevin's version of Overflow, who is bulkier and can generate green slime instead of water.
 Thornblade - Kevin's version of Wildvine, who has two thorny vines on his back instead of seeds.
 Skunkmoth - Kevin's version of Stinkfly, who is significantly larger and colored red with golden armor.
 Bashmouth - A wolf-like alien that seems to be Kevin's version of Rath, being able to generate metal.
 Alien V - A stronger version of Vilgax fused with Celestialsapien DNA, whose body is black with red outlines.
 Anti-Vilgax- A fusion of all of Kevin's aliens in Vilgax's body.
 Humungoraptor - Kevin's version of Humungousaur, who is red and Tyrannosaurus-like with golden armor on his arms. This alien is exclusive to Future Kevin.

Voice cast

Main 
 Tara Strong as Ben / Glitch / Original Series Ben / Buzzshock / Charmcaster / Sally / Mrs. Billions / Upgrade (Gwen version) / Amalgam Ben / Starshine / I.J. Crowling / Esther / Molecular Chef / Mary Jo Fourfeathers
 Yuri Lowenthal as Vilgax / Ben Prime (Teen) / Alien Force Ben / Ultimate Alien Ben / Omniverse Ben / Elderly Ben / Gax / Michael Morningstar (2nd time) / Ectonurite Prisoner
 Montserrat Hernandez as Gwen / President Gwen / Ripjaws
 David Kaye as Grandpa Max / Shock Rock / Humungousaur / Azmuth / Alternate Max / Bloxx / Shock-O (1st time) / Lagrange / Steve Lester / Mr. Billions / Melvin / Lord Decibel / Karl / Piscciss Volann Prisoner / A.I. Max
 John DiMaggio as Four Arms / Zombozo / Maurice / Thumbskull / Phil / Magg-O-Net Monster / Glamour Man / Harry / Loboan Prisoner / Secretary Zombozo / Future Maurice / Bobo Haha
 Daryl Sabara as Heatblast / Vulpimancer Prisoner / Rex Salazar
 Josh Keaton as XLR8 / Acid Breath / Sixsix / Shady Looking Dude / Ryan (1st time)
 Roger Craig Smith as Diamondhead / Way Big / Forever Knight / Steam Smythe / Iron Kyle / Penny / Kyle / Bill / Napoleon (second head) / Cash / Dirty Dobs / Gill / Rocky / Sergeant Smythe
 Travis Willingham as Cannonbolt / Sydney / Tim Buktu / Kraab
 Greg Cipes as Stinkfly / Kevin / Quad Smack / Hot Shot / Bashmouth / Wreckingbolt / Thornblade / Undertow / Dark Matter / Crystalfist / Bootleg / Rush / Skunkmoth / Humungoraptor / Goatadactyl / Robot Mannequin / Samurai Chef
 Dee Bradley Baker as Rath / Jetray / Goop / Spidermonkey / Chromastone / Big Chill / AmpFibian / Oliver / Napoleon (first head) / Nugget / Slurpstack / Cadobbit / King Koil / Opticoid Prisoner
 Todd Haberkorn as Grey Matter / Slapback / Tetrax / Grey Arms
 Max Mittelman as Overflow / Todd / J.T.
 David Hornsby as Wildvine / Sewer Chef
 David Sobolov as Upgrade / Vin Ethanol

Additional voices 
 Carlos Alazraqui as Chinzilla and Minitaur
 Ogie Banks as Ryan (2nd Time), Simon (2nd Time)
 Eric Bauza as Gust-O (1st Time)
 Drake Bell as Michael Morningstar (1st time)
 Jeff Bennett as Hail-O, Shock-O (later appearances), Gust-O (later appearances) Madcow, Wolfen Sheep
 Keith David as Yawk
 Debi Derryberry as Simon (1st Time)
 Jessica DiCicco as Frightwig
 Robin Atkin Downes as Hex, General Hex
 Tom Kenny as Xingo
 Vanessa Marshall as Queen Bee, Woman
 Rob Paulsen as Bruce, Coach Keene
 Dwight Schultz as Dr. Animo, Admiral Animo
 Gunnar Sizemore as Billy Billions
 Cree Summer as Hippie Vendor/Shasta Fay, Captain Betts McCabe 
 Fred Tatasciore as the High Override, Hydromanders, Bob, Boblins, Ben 10,000, Four Arms (Ben 10,000 version), Heatblast (Ben 10,000 version), Xerge, Surge
 Anna Vocino as Nanny Nightmare
 Audrey Wasilewski as Maxine
 Kath Soucie as the Malachi Sisters
 Kari Wahlgren as Quinn, the Malachi Sisters, and Lucky Girl (TV Character)

Crew
 Linda Lamontagne - Main Casting Director
 Collette Sunderman - Casting Director and Voice Director

Production
Cartoon Network announced on June 8, 2015, that Ben 10 was to be relaunched with a new revival television series. In June 2016, the network began to release information about the show. Its sneak peek was released at the 2016 SDCC on July 21, 2016. The series had its world premiere on October 1, 2016, in Australia. In March 2017 at the Cartoon Network's 2017 Upfront, it was announced that the series would premiere in the United States on April 10, 2017, and that it would be possible to watch episodes of the series on the Cartoon Network app ahead of its television premiere.

Building on the franchise about the kid hero Ben Tennyson, Ben 10 introduces a re-imagined Ben (in his 10-year-old form), his cousin Gwen, and Grandpa Max, as they travel the country during summer vacation. When Ben finds the Omnitrix, a mysterious watch that transforms him into 10 different aliens, a world of extraterrestrial superpowers opens up to him. Produced by Cartoon Network Studios, the series is created and executively produced by Man of Action, with John Fang on board as supervising producer but also as executive producer. It is animated by Sunmin Image Pictures and Mua Film.

On May 22, 2017, the series was renewed for a second season which premiered on February 19, 2018. On March 8, 2018, the series was renewed for a third season which premiered on February 23, 2019. On January 10, 2019, the series was renewed for a fourth season, which premiered on January 19, 2020.

On February 17, 2021, it was announced there would be three 44-minute specials.

Ratings and reception

Critical response
The reboot has received negative reception from critics and fans alike. On IMDb, it has a rating of 2.9/10.

Ratings
Despite getting bad reviews,
in the United States, the series has been viewed by 41 million viewers across multiple platforms.

In the EMEA, the series has reached more than 27 million viewers. It reached 1.2 million viewers and 9% of boys on CITV in the UK. It was watched by half of the boys in South Africa, Romania, Spain and Portugal, more than 30% of boys in Hungary, Poland, and Sweden, and has also received high ratings in France and Italy.

Other media

Home media

Printed media
In October 2017, Panini UK partnered with Cartoon Network and launched a magazine for the series with an original 8-page comic strip every month written by Jason Quinn with art by Russ Leach.

Toys and merchandise
In June 2015, a toy line for the series was announced to be released in the fall of 2017 by Playmates Toys. It was released in the United States at Toys R Us in June 2017 and in all other retailers in August.

In July 2017, toys were released by Playmates Toys, with Flair distributing them in the UK and Giochi Preziosi Group releasing them everywhere else in the EMEA. Cartoon Network has partnered with various licensing partners across the EMEA to release merchandise ranging from apparel to accessories to publishing.

Video games
A video game based on the series was released worldwide on November 10, 2017 (for Microsoft Windows, Nintendo Switch, PlayStation 4, and Xbox One). It was published by Outright Games and distributed by Bandai Namco Entertainment in the EMEA. In the game, players must help Ben defeat three of his greatest enemies: Zombozo, Queen Bee, and the Weatherheads. On March 3, 2020, it was announced that a second game was in development and was released on October 9, 2020. It was called Ben 10: Power Trip.

Ben 10 Challenge
Ben 10 Challenge is a live-action game show produced by the Spanish production company La Competencia Productions in Madrid for Turner EMEA. It follows two teams of people who compete in challenges and get tested on their Ben 10 knowledge. Versions were created for France, Germany, Italy, the Middle East, Poland, Spain, Turkey, and the UK, with the Spanish version also airing in Portugal dubbed. The English version premiered in the UK and Ireland on October 13, 2017, and in Africa on December 23, 2017.

References

External links

 
 Official website on Cartoon Network UK
 Ben 10 on Cartoon Network
 Ben 10 on Cartoon Network Asia
 Ben 10 on Cartoon Network Australia
 Panini UK's Official Ben 10 Magazine's page

Ben 10 television series
2017 American television series debuts
2017 animated television series debuts
2010s American animated television series
2020s American animated television series
2010s American comic science fiction television series
2020s American comic science fiction television series
2021 American television series endings
English-language television shows
Cartoon Network original programming
American children's animated action television series
American children's animated adventure television series
American children's animated comic science fiction television series
American children's animated science fantasy television series
American children's animated superhero television series
Animated television series about children
Television series about shapeshifting
Television series about vacationing
Television series by Cartoon Network Studios
Animated television series reboots
Anime-influenced Western animated television series